A series finale is the final installment of an episodic entertainment series, most often a television series. It may also refer to a final theatrical sequel, the last part of a television miniseries, the last installment of a literary series, or any final episode.

Origins in television
Most early television series consisted of stand-alone episodes rather than continuing story arcs, so there was little reason to provide closure at the end of their runs. Early comedy series that had special finale episodes include Howdy Doody in September 1960, Leave It to Beaver in June 1963, Hank in April 1966, and The Dick Van Dyke Show in June 1966. One of the few dramatic series to have a planned finale during this period was Route 66, which concluded in March 1964 with a two-part episode in which the pair of philosophical drifters ended their journey across America and then went their separate ways.

Considered to be "the series finale that invented the modern-day series finale," the August 1967 final episode of ABC's The Fugitive, "The Judgment: Part 2", attracted a 72% audience share when broadcast. This remained the highest viewership percentage in U.S. television history until the 1977 finale of the TV mini-series Roots (on the same network) and later the 1980 resolution episode of the internationally prominent "Who Shot J.R.?" cliffhanger of CBS' Dallas.

Notable television series finales

Most-watched American series finales

The most watched series finale in U.S. television history remains the 1983 finale of the CBS war/medical dramedy M*A*S*H, titled "Goodbye, Farewell and Amen". Viewed by 105.9 million viewers and drawing 77% of those watching televisions at the time, the finale of M*A*S*H held the record for most watched telecast of all-time for decades until 2010's Super Bowl XLIV edged it out with 106 million viewers, which coincidentally also aired on CBS. However, M*A*S*H'''s final episode remains the all-time most-watched U.S. television episode (and so far, the only single television episode in U.S. history to be watched by at least 100 million viewers for a single telecast).

The second-most-watched series finale in U.S. television history was the 1993 finale of the NBC comedy Cheers, titled "One for the Road". "One for the Road" was watched by between 80.4 million and 93.5 million viewers (estimates vary) while drawing 64% of TVs turned on at the time. To date, "One for the Road" remains the most watched U.S. TV series finale following the rise of cable television, and in terms of sheer viewership numbers for non-sports programming, sits second only to the aforementioned finale of M*A*S*HWith only slightly fewer viewers than the series finale of Cheers was the finale of its one-time follow-up on NBC's "Must See TV" Thursday night line-up, the absurdist NBC comedy Seinfeld. The third most-watched U.S. TV series finale in television history, Seinfelds controversial 1998 episode "The Finale" was watched by 76.3 million people, drawing 67% of all televisions turned on at the time – as the New York Times put it, "grazing Super Bowl country" in terms of viewership.

With the shift away from network television viewing toward cable television viewing (and later, internet use) that occurred during the decade between the finales of M*A*S*H (1983) and Cheers (1993) – and continued unabated until and beyond the finale of Seinfeld (1998) – it remains debatable which of these three "event" series finales accomplished the most impressive viewership numbers. Moreover, a large gap in viewership numbers exists between the Super Bowl-sized audiences of the M*A*S*H, Cheers and Seinfeld finales, and the fourth and fifth most watched series finales in television history – respectively, those of the comedy Friends (2004, NBC, 52.5 million viewers) and the detective procedural Magnum, P.I. (1988, CBS, 50.7 million viewers). The Friends finale's ("The Last One") viewership numbers dwarf those of all finales since the start of the new millennium and seem particularly impressive in light of the increased media options since the 1990s "event" finales of Cheers (1993) and Seinfeld (1998).

 Reception 

No matter how critically lauded during their respective runs, relatively few popular television series finales end up pleasing critics and audiences universally, or escaping controversy. Prominent examples of controversial series finales include the final episodes of the comedies Roseanne ("Into That Good Night", 1997), Seinfeld ("The Finale", 1998), How I Met Your Mother ("Last Forever", 2014), and Two and a Half Men ("Of Course He's Dead", 2015), and those of the dramas The Sopranos ("Made in America", 2007), Game of Thrones (“The Iron Throne”, 2019), Lost ("The End", 2010), True Blood ("Thank You", 2014), and Dexter ("Remember the Monsters?", 2013). The final episodes of Dexter, How I Met Your Mother and Game of Thrones, in particular, caused massive backlash from both fans and critics upon airing, and are often regarded as the worst finales in recent memory.

Certain endings have proved extremely divisive among viewers immediately on airing, leading to extensive discussions online, but ended up being generally lauded by critics. Notable examples of this trend are the final episodes of The Sopranos, The Wire, and Lost. For example, The Sopranos finale caused millions of viewers to temporarily believe they had lost cable service due to an abrupt blackout. However, all three episodes were also nominated for multiple Primetime Emmy Awards, including Outstanding Writing, with The Sopranos episode even winning.

Several iconic television series have, however, managed to produce final episodes that lived up to both critics' and audiences' expectations. Examples include the twist endings that concluded both the Newhart and St. Elsewhere finales, the mixture of comedy and resonance that wrapped up The Mary Tyler Moore Show, Cheers, The Nanny, The Fresh Prince of Bel-Air, Friends, Everybody Loves Raymond, Mike & Molly, The Middle, Superstore, and Brooklyn Nine-Nine and the redemption arc that concluded The Fugitive.

Several more series finales have received unanimous critical and popular acclaim, and are often considered as benchmarks for great TV endings. Recent examples include the finales of Friday Night Lights ("Always", 2011), 30 Rock ("Last Lunch", 2013), The Office (US) ("Finale", 2013), Breaking Bad ("Felina", 2013), Community ("Emotional Consequences of Broadcast Television", 2015), Mad Men ("Person To Person", 2015), Avatar: The Last Airbender's ("Sozin's Comet", 2008), Adventure Time's ("Come Along With Me", 2018), Regular Show's ("A Regular Epic Final Battle", 2017), Justified ("The Promise", 2015), Person of Interest ("return 0", 2016), The Leftovers ("The Book of Nora", 2017), The Americans ("START", 2018), Mr. Robot ("Hello Elliot", 2019), Schitt's Creek ("Happy Ending", 2020), The Good Place ("Whenever You're Ready", 2020), Star Wars: The Clone Wars ("Victory and Death", 2020), and Better Call Saul ("Saul Gone", 2022).

Examples of universally acclaimed finales from earlier in the millennium include those of The Office (UK) ("Interview", 2002), The Shield ("Family Meeting", 2008), and Six Feet Under ("Everyone's Waiting", 2005), the last of which TV Guide ranked at No. 22 on their list of "TV's Top 100 Episodes of All Time".

Plot devices

Television series finales frequently feature fundamental deviations from the central plot line, such as the resolution of a central mystery or problem, (e.g. Dallas, Two and a Half Men, Full House) the separation or return of a major character (e.g. Cheers, That '70s Show, The Office) or an event signifying the end of an era, such as a change to primary setting for the series (e.g. The Mary Tyler Moore Show, Boy Meets World, Martin, Liv and Maddie)

Series finales will sometimes include clips or characters from the series' past (e.g. Seinfeld, Six Feet Under, Martin, Star Trek: The Next Generation), and the ending moments of the episode often take place in the show's primary setting.

In rare examples, game shows have been given series finales; examples include The Hollywood Squares (which ended its 15-season run in syndication in 1981 with a "Grand Championship Tournament" that awarded a massive cache of prizes including a house to the winner of the tournament), Family Feud (which ended a nine-season run on ABC in 1985 with a tribute from Richard Dawson), Sale of the Century (which ended a six-season run on NBC in 1989), and History IQ (which ended its two-season run on History in 2001 with a $250,000 tournament of champions). Game shows conducted in a tournament format are more likely to have series finales; examples of those include The Million Second Quiz (which aired on NBC in September 2013) and Mental Samurai (which aired on Fox between March and May 2019).

Premature series finales
In some cases, a TV series finale proves premature, as was the case with Here's Lucy, 7th Heaven, Charmed, Babylon 5, and Arrested Development to name but a few. Some shows that have constantly been in danger of cancellation wrote every season finale with the idea that the episode would serve as a quality series finale if the network decided not to bring it back; in recent years from NBC's Thursday night comedy lineup, Parks and Recreation used this formula for the season finales for Seasons 3–6, before getting a renewal for a seventh and final season where the series finale was planned in advance, and Community wrote its fifth-season finale with the notion that whether the show found new life elsewhere or not, it would definitely not be returning to the network (while NBC did indeed cancel the show, it was renewed for a sixth season by Yahoo! Screen, where the season, and sure enough, series finale was once again scripted as a potential last episode ever; the final image is that of text reading "#andamovie", a reference to the show's recurring catchphrase "six seasons and a movie"). The series finale of Dr. Ken, a fictionalized sitcom based on the life of doctor-turned-actor Ken Jeong, features the title character trying out for a fictional version of Community (a show where Jeong was a cast member in real life).

The medical comedy Scrubs aired its two-part finale episode billed simply as a "My Finale" in May 2009 as the show's renewal or cancellation had not been decided as of its airing, and so it was not known whether the episode would conclude just the season or the entire series; Scrubs would eventually be renewed for one additional season, which became a de facto spin-off series titled Scrubs: Med School.

The cartoon Futurama has had four designated series finales, due to the recurringly uncertain future of the series. "The Devil's Hands Are Idle Playthings", "Into the Wild Green Yonder (Part 4)", "Overclockwise", and "Meanwhile" have all been written to serve as a final episode for the show.

The series American Dad! had two possible finales, the season premiere of the eighth season, "Hot Water" was written due to the uncertainty from the staff of the show getting picked up. The upcoming penultimate episode of Season 19 was also intended as a series finale, as revealed by showrunner and executive producer Matt Weitzman.

The series finale of The Lucy-Desi Comedy Hour (itself an epilogue to I Love Lucy) was unintentionally fitting: stars Lucille Ball and Desi Arnaz were about to divorce and end the show, a fact that the show's guest star for what would be the final program, Edie Adams, did not know when she chose the song she would sing on the program. Prophetically, the song was named "That's All." The series also ended with Lucy and Ricky making up and kissing, while in reality Ball and Arnaz would not (the two would eventually reconcile later in life, although both would go on to marry other people).  The last produced half-hour episode was titled "The Ricardos Dedicate a Statue" which included real-life kids Lucie Arnaz and Desi Arnaz Jr. in the final scene where Ricky unveils what he thinks is a Revolutionary War statue only to find out that it is Lucy.
 
The aforementioned Magnum, P.I. had a premature series finale, as well.  At the end of the seventh season, protagonist Thomas Magnum was to be killed off, which was intended to end the series. The final episode of the season, "Limbo", after seeing Magnum wander around as a ghost for nearly the entire run-time, closes with him appearing to walk off into heaven. However, following outcry from fans, who demanded a more satisfactory conclusion, an eighth, final season was produced, to bring Magnum "back to life", and to round the series off. The mystery of whether Higgins was Robin Masters, or not, was a highly anticipated series finale reveal. The mystery still has yet to be revealed. A number of other episodes also make reference to supernatural occurrences and the seeming existence of ghosts.

The Showtime series Californication was designed from start to make any season finale work as a series finale, in case of early cancelling the show. It is seen most primarily at the end of the first and fourth season.

After its fifth season, the sitcom Reba was in danger of being cancelled as a result of its original home, The WB, being replaced by The CW in September 2006, and the resulting uncertainty over which WB series (as well as which series from CW co-predecessor UPN) would be carried over to the new network. (Reba would be renewed by The CW for an additional season as one of the holdover WB series.) The sixth (and final) season's finale episode was written to serve as a series finale, in which Brock and Barbara-Jean come to a reconciliation and Van and Cheyenne move back in with Reba, bringing the show to a full wrap.

A series finale may not be the last aired episode of a show, such as King of the Hill, which produced "To Sirloin with Love" as its series finale, though four more episodes produced before it were aired after in syndication.

Finales launching spin-offs
Series finales are sometimes used as a backdoor pilot to launch spinoff series. Two well-known examples include The Andy Griffith Shows series finale, which launched the spinoff Mayberry RFD and The Practices series finale, and much of its final season was used as a launching pad for Boston Legal, starring James Spader and William Shatner. The Golden Girls series finale was set up to lead into a new series with most of the remaining cast, The Golden Palace, Three's Company transitioned more or less seamlessly into Three's a Crowd, the Henry Danger finale served as a pilot to Danger Force while The Fosters series finale acted as an introduction to its spin-off series Good Trouble. The Closer was spun off into a new series, Major Crimes the same night that the original ended, after star Kyra Sedgwick chose, as producer, to end the series.

The Steven Universe finale "Change Your Mind" served as not just a conclusion to the original series and its overarching plot, but helped pave the way for Steven Universe: The Movie, and eventually the limited epilogue series Steven Universe Future.

Some planned spin-offs that influenced series finales, however, never materialized, as in the case of the proposed Laverne & Shirley spin-off for Carmine that never came into fruition, or Posse Impossible, a proposed spin-off of Hong Kong Phooey that, instead of getting its own show, aired as an interstitial segment on CB Bears. Arrow'' used its penultimate episode of its final season as a backdoor pilot for a potential spin-off based on the characters of Mia Smoak, Laurel Lance and Dinah Drake, however, the spin-off series was ultimately not picked up.

See also
 Series premiere
 Season premiere
 Season finale
 Most-watched US series finales

References

 
Television terminology
Last events